Congenital epulis is a proliferation of cells most frequently occurring on the alveolar ridge of the upper jaw at birth.  Less frequently, the mass may arise from the mandibular alveolus.  Rare cases can arise from the tongue.  This lesion is more commonly found in female babies, suggesting hormonal involvement during embryonic development.  The cause of this type of epulis is unknown.  Also known as congenital granular cell tumor or Neumann's tumor; historically referred to as granular cell myoblastoma.

Multiple lesions occur in 10% of affected neonates.  The tumor is typically pedunculated and varies in maximum size from 0.5 cm to 9 cm.  The lesion is typically painless and does not increase in size after discovery.  Some small lesions may regress over time.  Treatment is surgical excision.  Recurrence is extremely rare even after incomplete excision.

References
Kahn, Michael A. Basic Oral and Maxillofacial Pathology. Volume 1. 2001.

Husain AN, Stocker JT, Dehner LP. Stocker and Dehner's Pediatric Pathology, 4th Ed. Wolters Kluwer, 2016, page 1027.

Goldblum JR, Folpe AL, Weiss SW. Enzinger and Weiss's Soft Tissue Tumors, 6th Ed.  Elsevier Saunders, 2014, page 845.

External links 

Periodontal disorders